Located approximately  offshore on picturesque Block Island, the Block Island National Wildlife Refuge provides important habitat for wildlife, and a place for people to appreciate the natural environment of the island.

Block Island National Wildlife Refuge is administered as part of the Rhode Island National Wildlife Refuge Complex, which manages all five of the National Wildlife Refuges in Rhode Island, and is headquartered in Charlestown, Rhode Island.

Refuge lands on Block Island are most notable for the large concentration (over 70 species) of migratory songbirds which visit the area each fall. Located in the Atlantic flyway, many young, inexperienced songbirds "overfly" the mainland and stopover on Block Island before continuing their migration. The result is a cornucopia of young migratory songbirds from a variety of different species. Block Island is internationally recognized as one of the most important migratory bird habitats on the east coast, attracting hundreds of "birders" to the island each fall.

The refuge also provides habitat for the endangered American burying beetle, supporting the only population of this species known east of the Mississippi River. Piping plovers occur on the island (a threatened species) as do four other state species of concern. The refuge is also home to the largest gull colony in Rhode Island.

References
Refuge website
Friends of the National Wildlife Refuges of Rhode Island

National Wildlife Refuges in Rhode Island
Protected areas established in 1973
Protected areas of Washington County, Rhode Island
New Shoreham, Rhode Island
1973 establishments in Rhode Island